The 1994 Southwest Texas State Bobcats football team was an American football team that represented Southwest Texas State University (now known as Texas State University) during the 1994 NCAA Division I-AA football season as a member of the Southland Conference (SLC). In their third year under head coach Jim Bob Helduser, the team compiled an overall record of 4–7 with a mark of 1–5 in conference play.

Schedule

References

Southwest Texas State
Texas State Bobcats football seasons
Southwest Texas State Bobcats football